Bubbling Spring may refer to:

Bubbling Spring (Arizona)
Bubbling Spring (Arkansas)
Bubbling Spring (California)
Bubbling Spring (Eddy County, New Mexico)
Bubbling Spring (Rio Arriba County, New Mexico)
Bubbling Spring (Oregon)
Bubbling Spring (Pennsylvania)
Bubbling Spring (Tennessee)
Bubbling Spring (Virginia)
Bubbling Spring, West Virginia, a populated place
Bubbling Spring (West Virginia), a stream